Iraheta is a Salvadoran surname of Basque origins. Notable people with the name include:
 
Allison Iraheta (born 1992), American singer who placed 4th on season 8 of American Idol
Marvin Iraheta (born 1992), Salvadoran football midfielder
Wilfredo Iraheta (born 1967), Salvadoran football defender
William Renderos Iraheta (born 1971), Salvadoran footballer
Roberto Iraheta (born 1960), Salvadorian-Canadian Editor & Publisher of El Independiente Canadian Newspaper, Radio Acción, Microfono Callejero y Factory News.

References

Basque-language surnames